Así es la vida may refer to:

Film
Thus Is Life, a 1930 American film
Such Is Life (1939 film)
Such Is Life (1977 film)
Such Is Life (2000 film)

Music
La Vida es Así, a 2010 reggaeton single by Ivy Queen
"Así es la Vida", 1994 song by Luis Enrique
"Así es la Vida", 2002 song by Olga Tañón from the album Sobrevivir